Oxfordshire County Council is the county council (upper-tier local authority) for the non-metropolitan county of Oxfordshire in the South East of England. Established in 1889, it is an elected body responsible for most strategic local government services in the county.

Oxfordshire County Council provides a wide range of services, including education (schools, libraries and youth services), social services, public health, highway maintenance, waste disposal, emergency planning, consumer protection and town and country planning for matters to do with minerals, waste, highways and education. This makes it one of the largest employers in Oxfordshire, with a gross expenditure budget of £856.2 million in 2021–22.

History
County councils were first introduced in England and Wales with full powers from 22 September 1889 as a result of the Local Government Act 1888, taking over administrative functions until then carried out by the unelected quarter sessions. The areas they covered were termed administrative counties and were not in all cases identical to the traditional shire counties, but in Oxfordshire the whole 'ceremonial county' came under the authority of the new council. The new system of local democracy was a significant development and reflected the increasing range of functions carried out by local government in late Victorian Britain.

The first elections to the new county council were held in January 1889. At the first meeting, several aldermen were elected.

Schools (both primary and secondary) were added to the County Council's responsibilities in 1902, and until the 1990s it was also responsible for operating Colleges of Further Education.

Oxfordshire County Council has seen a changing pattern of lower-tier authorities existing alongside it within its area, responsible for more local services, such as housing and waste collection. Until 1974, the county had a large number of urban district and rural district councils. In 1974, local government was reorganized in England and Wales generally, and Oxfordshire was enlarged to take in areas previously in Berkshire. Within its new area dozens of former urban and rural districts were amalgamated into one city council, that of Oxford, and four district councils: Cherwell, South Oxfordshire, the Vale of White Horse, and West Oxfordshire.

Elections 
Since 1889, members have been elected for a term of office, with elections held all together (initially every three years, later every four years) on the "first past the post" system. Until the 1970s, the elected members chose aldermen, whose term of office was for six years, and who once appointed were also voting members of the council. This form of membership was ended by the Local Government Act 1972, so that after 1974 only honorary (that is, non-voting) aldermen could be appointed.

Current composition 
As of August 2021, the council composition is as follows:

* Although the initial result was the Conservatives on 22 seats, and Labour on 15, there was a significant error in the Banbury Ruscote division where the Conservative and Labour votes were accidentally reversed and the Conservative candidate declared elected. An electoral challenge was launched by Labour and the result corrected to a Labour win.

Following the 2021 election the Conservative Party lost seats primarily at the expense of Liberal Democrat gains including the Conservative leader Ian Hudspeth, who had served as leader since May 2012 and councillor since 2005, resulting in their worst performance in Oxfordshire since its inception in 1973. Likewise this was the highest number of seats the Liberal Democrats have held on this council. Liberal Democrat and Green councillors currently form a joint group known as Liberal Democrat Green Alliance.

History of political control

Past Chairs

Catherine Fulljames (2005–2006)
Lesley Legge (2006–2007)
Don Seale (2012–2013)
Timothy Hallchurch MBE (2013-2014)
Anne Purse (2014–2015)
John Sanders (2015–2016)
 Michael Waine (2016–2017)
 Zoe Patrick (2017–2018)
 Gill Sanders (2018–2019)
 Les Sibley (2019–2020)

Notable members
Sir Jervoise Athelstane Baines , member 1917–22, later Indian Civil Service administrator
Jonathan Baume, member 1974–77, trade unionist
Catherine Bearder MEP, member
Angela Billingham, member 1993–94, later Baroness Billingham
William Bradshaw, Baron Bradshaw, member 1993–2008
Peter Butler, member 1985–89, later Member of Parliament for Milton Keynes North East
Sherman Stonor, 6th Baron Camoys, member
Julia Drown, member 1989–96, later Member of Parliament for Swindon South
Michael Patrick Fogarty, member 1981–89, academic
Olive Gibbs, chairman 1974–1975 and 1981–1982
Simon Hoare MP, member
John Howell, member 2004–09, later Member of Parliament
Caroline Lucas, member 1993–97, later Member of Parliament for Brighton Pavilion
George Parker, 7th Earl of Macclesfield, chairman 1937–70
James Plaskitt, member 1985–97, later Member of Parliament
Geoffrey Somerset, 6th Baron Raglan, member 1988–1993
John Redwood, member 1973–77, later Member of Parliament for Wokingham
Larry Sanders, member 2005–13, Green Party Spokesperson for Health and brother of U.S. Senator Bernie Sanders

Meat and dairy ban controversy 
In 2021, the LibDem/Green/Labour administration moved a motion at Full Council to serve only plant-based (vegan) meals at all council-catered events and meetings plus vegan school meals in the primary schools on two days a week as part of its climate change action policy. The move was unsuccessfully fought by the Conservative opposition. This policy was controversial and drew protests from livestock farmers and TV presenter Jeremy Clarkson, who owns a farm in the county. As a result of the controversy, when the motion came to the council's Cabinet for ratification in March 2022, the proposals were scaled back to cover just seven council meetings and school meals only one day a week. In November 2022, Conservatives sought to cancel the vegan meals at council-catered events, which cost £6,000 annually and are purchased from a Kidlington business which sources food from Woodstock. However, the motion failed.

See also
 List of electoral wards in Oxfordshire

Notes

External links

 
1889 establishments in England
County councils of England
Leader and cabinet executives
Local authorities in Oxfordshire
Local education authorities in England
Local government in Oxfordshire
Major precepting authorities in England